The following is a list of all of the individuals who have served on the Supreme Court of Missouri.

Missouri's Supreme Court had three judges from 1820 until 1872, when it was increased to five.  In 1890 the number of judges was increased to seven, which is still the standard.

Only the Chief Justice is referred to as "justice" while other members are referred to as "judge."  The chief justice is typically elected to a two-year term on a rotating basis by a vote of the Supreme Court judges.

References

Official Manual, State of Missouri, 2005-2006. Jefferson City, MO:Secretary of State.

 
Missouri
Justices